Rein Maran (born 13 September 1931, in Tartu) is an Estonian cinematographer, director, and professor, most notable for teaching at Tallinn University. In 1972, he graduated from a cinematography school. In 1967 he joined Tallinnfilm, and later Eesti Telefilm. On his initiative, he established the Stodom photo group and, in 1989, the Tallinn Photo Club. He is part the Estonian Filmmakers Union, and was its chairman from 1989 to 1993. Since 1996, he teaches at Tallinn University, as part of the culture faculty of film and video training. He has created a series of films about nature, which is also reflected in folk traditions. Maran has also worked with other directors, movies, and documentaries. He is part of the 100 great Estonians of the 20th century.

Acknowledgements
1984 Estonian SSR Great Sign of Nature
1986 Estonian SSR Honoured Art Figure
1987 Estonian SSR State Prize
1991 Eerik Kumari Award
1996 Estonian Cultural Endowment Lifetime Achievement Award
2000: 4th Class of the Order of the White Star (received 23 February 2000)
2011 Black Nights Film Festival Lifetime Achievement Award

References

1931 births
Living people
People from Tartu
Estonian photographers
Recipients of the Order of the White Star, 4th Class